At least two warships of Japan have borne the name Asama:

 a screw frigate launched in 1868 and struck in 1894
 an  launched in 1898 and broken up in 1946

Japanese Navy ship names
Imperial Japanese Navy ship names